HistoAtlas is a free collection of historic geographic information of the human culture all over the world. This is achieved as a time enabled geographic information system (GIS) on the web. All information can be used and edited freely and is intended to be a resource for education, archaeologists, historians and others.

Introduction

HistoAtlas provides a system to actively maintain historical information derived from historical records and check if it is consistent. It is not meant for the discovery of new historical facts but to put everything together so it can be presented as one whole story.

It is an open project making sure everyone benefits from it. Everyone can use the information and can collaborate on the project. Its main audience is the general public but it should also have enough historical details so also historians should be able to enjoy it.

HistoAtlas is not only able to visualize the changes in extent of different countries, but also the events that caused this change altogether, because these things are historically more important than just the change of a border.

The atlas has information about different aspects of history. A few examples.

 Political boundaries based on antique historical records or archeological research.
 Historical events like wars, disasters, discoveries, treaties and journeys that shaped the course of time.
 Facts about historical figures and their families that played an important role in history.
 The evolution of cultural aspects like languages and religions.

Strategy

HistoAtlas aims to be a free, multilingual historical encyclopedia, intended as the most precise open content global historical reference.

In concept there are some similarities to what online encyclopedia like Wikipedia are doing, with differences on how data is stored, presented and used. It is a history oriented geographic information system. Information is structured more transparently so it can be searched more efficiently and presented in different ways. Wikipedia and other encyclopedia are focused on articles and are not able to create maps efficiently because they are not meant to do this.

But like Wikipedia the information and application will be made available under an open license, meaning it will be maintained by volunteers who want to share their knowledge.

Consistency

The vision that HistoAtlas wants to put forward is the one of a collaborative system. Scientists require that the information is correct. Making sure that data is correct will be a high priority of the system. For now only a basic system has been put in place, but this will be extended in the future.

Licensing

Everything developed for the project is licensed under an open license. It can be used and improved by anyone.

All data published under the project is put under a Creative Commons Attribution-ShareAlike License.

See also
Table of Historical Maps

References
 HistoAtlas official website
 Ian N. Gregory: A place in History A short introduction to HGIS by the lead developers of GBHGIS ISSN 1463-5194

Online encyclopedias
Wikis about geography
Geographic information systems
Historical geographic information systems
History websites
History maps
Atlases
Maps
Belgian online encyclopedias
Map websites